Limacella bangladeshana is a species of the fungal family Amanitaceae. It is the first generic report for Bangladesh.

References

External links

Amanitaceae
Fungi described in 2017
Fungi of Bangladesh